was a town located in Nakagami District, Okinawa Prefecture, Japan. It is on the Katsuren Peninsula.

As of 2003, the town had an estimated population of 13,530 and a density of 986.87 persons per km2. The total area was 13.71 km2.

On April 1, 2005, Katsuren, along with the cities of Gushikawa and Ishikawa, and the town of Yonashiro (also from Nakagami District), was merged to create the city of Uruma.

Photography
Katsuren Photos,  HDR Photography of the Katsuren region of Okinawa.

External links
Town of Katsuren website (archives)
Uruma official website

Dissolved municipalities of Okinawa Prefecture